Randy Boyd (Indianapolis) is an American novelist. His novels include Uprising (2001) and The Devil Inside (2002).

Uprising was a finalist for the Lambda Literary Award for Gay Mystery.

References

21st-century American novelists
American male novelists
Writers from Indianapolis
Year of birth missing (living people)
Living people
University of California, Los Angeles alumni
People with HIV/AIDS
American LGBT writers
21st-century American male writers
Novelists from Indiana